In enzymology, a cystine reductase is an enzyme that catalyzes the chemical reaction

2 L-cysteine + NAD+  L-cystine + NADH + H+

Thus, the two substrates of this enzyme are L-cysteine and NAD+, whereas its 3 products are L-cystine, NADH, and H+.

This enzyme belongs to the family of oxidoreductases, specifically those acting on a sulfur group of donors with NAD+ or NADP+ as acceptor.  The systematic name of this enzyme class is L-cysteine:NAD+ oxidoreductase. Other names in common use include cystine reductase (NADH), NADH-dependent cystine reductase, cystine reductase (NADH2), and NADH2:L-cystine oxidoreductase.  This enzyme participates in cysteine metabolism.

References

 
 
 

EC 1.8.1
NADH-dependent enzymes
Enzymes of unknown structure